Kedrovy Urban Okrug is the name of several municipal formations in Russia. The following administrative divisions are incorporated as such:
Settlement of Kedrovy, Krasnoyarsk Krai
Kedrovy Town Under Oblast Jurisdiction, Tomsk Oblast

See also
Kedrovy (disambiguation)

References